Switzerland competed at the 2016 Winter Youth Olympics in Lillehammer, Norway from 12 to 21 February 2016.

Medalists

Medalists in mixed NOCs events

Alpine skiing

Boys

Girls

Parallel mixed team

Biathlon

Boys

Girls

Mixed

Bobsleigh

Cross-country skiing

Boys

Girls

Curling

Mixed team

Team
Laura Engler
Philipp Hösli
Henwy Lochmann
Selina Witschonke

Round Robin

Draw 1

Draw 2

Draw 3

Draw 4

Draw 5

Draw 6

Draw 7

Quarterfinals

Semifinals

Bronze Medal Game

Final Rank:

Mixed doubles

Freestyle skiing

Halfpipe

Ski cross

Slopestyle

Ice hockey

Girls' tournament

Roster

 Sina Bachmann
 Sydney Berta
 Tina Brand
 Yaël Brich
 Oona Emmenegger
 Rahel Enzler
 Ramona Forrer
 Justine Forster
 Janine Hauser
 Saskia Maurer
 Lisa Rüedi
 Noemi Ryhner
 Jessica Schlegel
 Gionina Spiess
 Nicole Vallario
 Stefanie Wetli
 Lara Zimmermann

Group Stage

Semifinals

Bronze medal game

Final Rank:

Skeleton

Ski jumping

Snowboarding

Halfpipe

Snowboard cross

Slopestyle

Snowboard and ski cross relay

Qualification legend: FA – Qualify to medal round; FB – Qualify to consolation round

Speed skating

Girls

Mixed team sprint

See also
Switzerland at the 2016 Summer Olympics

References

2016 in Swiss sport
Nations at the 2016 Winter Youth Olympics
Switzerland at the Youth Olympics